Craig Allen may refer to:

 Craig Allen (footballer) (born 1959), former Guernsey football (soccer) player
 Craig Allen (meteorologist) (born 1957), New York meteorologist
 Craig B. Allen (born 1957), American diplomat and ambassador

See also
Allen (surname)